Anton Grăjdieru was a journalist and politician from the Republic of Moldova. He served as a member of the Supreme Soviet of the Soviet Union.

He was the first editor in chief of the Romanian language program on Radio Kiev. Also, he was editor in chief of Învăţămîntul public in Chişinău; on 18 September 1988 the newspapers published the Letter of the 66, an important call for a return to the Latin alphabet.

In 1989, Anton Grăjdieru was elected as a member of the Supreme Soviet of the Soviet Union.

See also
Politics of Moldova

References

External links
 50 de personalităţi ale epocee 87-89
 Gheorghe Duca, “INTELECTUALITATEA DE LA CHIŞINĂU A APROPIAT VICTORIILE ANULUI ISTORIC 1989”

Year of birth missing (living people)
Living people
Male journalists
Moldovan journalists
Popular Front of Moldova politicians